Salacia petenensis is a tropical tree native to Central America.  It is found in cloud forests and along the eastern coast of Costa Rica at elevations of 1500 to 1700 m.  It flowers from March through May and also in October and November.  The flowers are tiny and have an odor like rotten fruit.

References

Trees of Costa Rica
petenensis